The history of the Jews in Nigeria is a complex subject.

The historic presence of Judaism in Nigeria is a cause of debate, as there are several Judaic-oriented religious groups among the largest ethnic groups in the largely populated nation. The groups claim that their religious practices result either from hundreds of years of continuous practice of Judaic or Judaic-like customs by their ethnic groups, customs inherited from the Jews of Bilad el-Sudan or by a more-recent departure from European Christianity to modern Judaism. Either way, Judaism in Nigeria has developed demographically with the interest of Jewish peoples in other countries, especially Israel and the United States.

Rabbi Yisrael Uzan, a leader in the Alliance of Rabbis in Islamic States serves as the Chief Rabbi of Nigeria and the Chabad representative in Abuja. Rabbi Mendel Sternbach serves as Rabbi of Lagos. They are involved in Humanitarian Aid, especially prior to Ramadan.

Igbo Jews 

The Igbo Jews of Nigeria are one of the components of the Igbo ethnic group.

Certain Nigerian communities with Judaic practices have been receiving help from individual Israelis and American Jews who work in Nigeria, out-reach organizations like Kulanu, and African-American Jewish communities in America. Jews from outside Nigeria founded two synagogues in Nigeria, which are attended and maintained by Igbos. 
Because no formal census has been taken in the region, the number of Igbos in Nigeria who identify as either Israelites or Jews is not known. There are currently 26 synagogues of various sizes. An estimated 4,000 Igbos were practicing some form of Judaism in 2016. Some synagogues in Nigeria include: CHW known as Community of Hashem Worldwide with several synagogues around Nigeria and some part of Cameroon.

Akwa Ibom and Cross River Jews 

The Annang, Efik, and Ibibio people of Akwa Ibom and Cross River States of Nigeria have had ancient religious practices that strongly resembled some of the Jewish Torah. These include their traditional sacrifice of animals (rituals) by the presiding male of each village, or of a group of villages, for purification, especially during times of sickness. They have active synagogues with majority of the synagogues in the eastern part of the country a vibrant one in Abuja supported and provided with many Jewish materials by different Rabbis. There are also key synagogues in Port Harcourt and Lagos.

References

 
Nigeria